Geumjeong-dong is neighbourhood of Gunpo, Gyeonggi Province, South Korea.

External links
 Geumjeong-dong 

Neighbourhoods in Gunpo